Susan Mary Lenehan (born 2 November 1943) is a former Australian politician. She was a Labor Party member of the South Australian House of Assembly between 1982 and 1993, representing the electorate of Mawson. In 1993 she contested the seat of Reynell, losing to the Liberal party's Julie Greig.

Lenehan held portfolios including Minister for Education, Minister for Planning and Environment. In 2008 she was one of the participants in the Population, sustainability, climate change and water section of the Australia 2020 Summit.

References 

1943 births
Living people
Members of the South Australian House of Assembly
Australian Labor Party members of the Parliament of South Australia
Women members of the South Australian House of Assembly